JSwat is a graphical Java debugger front-end, written to use the Java Platform Debugger Architecture. JSwat is licensed under the Common Development and Distribution License and is freely available in both binary and source code form. In addition to the graphical interface, there is a console based version which operates very much like jdb, the debugger included with the Java Development Kit.

Features include breakpoints with conditionals and monitors; colorized source code display; graphical display panels showing threads, stack frames, visible variables, and loaded classes; command interface for more advanced features; Java-like expression evaluation, including method invocation.

As of 2013, JSwat was "effectively discontinued" according to its GitHub page. Recommended replacements include IDEs equipped with JPDA debuggers, such as IntelliJ IDEA, Eclipse, and NetBeans.

External links
Project site

Debuggers
Java development tools
Java (programming language) software
Free software programmed in Java (programming language)